Michael Killian (born 22 November 1983) is a former South African rugby union player.

Career
He started his career at the Kings (previously known as the Mighty Elephants) and made 58 appearances for them over 7 seasons.

He was also named in the  squad for the 2013 Super Rugby season.

He announced his retirement from rugby in April 2014 to pursue a career in the corporate sector.

References

External links

Lions profile
itsrugby.co.uk profile

Living people
1983 births
South African rugby union players
Golden Lions players
Lions (United Rugby Championship) players
Rugby union wings
People from Uitenhage
White South African people
Eastern Province Elephants players
Southern Kings players
Rugby union players from the Eastern Cape